Poothan and Thira is a ritualistic art form found in the South Malabar region of Kerala in India, in which people dance in costumes representing Poothan is the lieutenant of Kali, and Thira, the goddess Kali, to the accompaniment of drummers. Thudi a small drum using for poothan, and heavy drum para accompanying thira. 

It is usually performed once a year in villages in conjunction with the Kali temple festivals mainly in the coastal areas and River Nila- especially in the Pooram festival season between December and May. 

A typical Poothan and Thira performance includes shouts and wild gestures and may include percussion and horns as well as drums. The dancers wear large fan-shaped head-dresses and imposing masks, often with sticking-out tongues and bulging eyes. The dancer playing Poothan usually wears a bright coloured tightly woven costume, often including bright red elements and embellished with gold-coloured trinkets that rattle when the dancer moves. The dancer playing Thira wears a semicircular black crown with symbols of the goddess embossed on it.  

Performers are traditionally from the Mannan Hindu sub-caste of rural Palakkad, southern parts of Malappuram and northern parts of Thrissur. 

The epic Malayalam poem Poothappattu by Edasseri Govindan Nair is based on the Poothan and Thira tradition. There are various myths connection with Poothan...

References

External links

 Kerala Tourism
 Kerala Festivals

Culture of Kerala